Mandria (also spelled Μαντριά) is a village in the Paphos District of Cyprus, located 2 km east of Timi. Mandria is thought to have been founded around 500 years ago by Turkish Cypriots who originally called it 'green plain' ('Yeşilova').

References

Communities in Paphos District